Fung Kwok Wai (born 22 August 1977 in Hong Kong) is an internationally notable Hong Kong amateur snooker player.

Fung reached the quarter final at the 2006 IBSF World Championships in Amman, Jordan, where he was eliminated by Daniel Ward 6–3. He won the silver medal in the 2006 Asian Games with the men's snooker team.    He also won the gold medal in the 2009 East Asian Games with the men's snooker team.

References

 

Living people
1977 births
Hong Kong snooker players
Asian Games medalists in cue sports
Cue sports players at the 2010 Asian Games
Cue sports players at the 2006 Asian Games
Cue sports players at the 2002 Asian Games

Asian Games gold medalists for Hong Kong
Asian Games silver medalists for Hong Kong
Medalists at the 2002 Asian Games
Medalists at the 2006 Asian Games